The Hamburg Half Marathon is an annual road running event held in Hamburg, Germany.

History 
The race was first run in 1995 in Hamburg Stadtpark and was named the Hamburg-Mannheimer Cup.  In 2003, the course was changed so that it ran through the city, and the race was renamed Hamburg Halbmarathon (Hamburg Half Marathon).  Hella became the title sponsor the following year, in 2004.

The 2020 edition of the race was cancelled due to the coronavirus pandemic, with registrants having the option of transferring their entry to 2021.

Course
The start is on the Reeperbahn and heads west before turning east along the banks of the Elbe and through the city. It makes a lap of the Außenalster before finishing on the Rothenbaumchaussee.

Past winners

References

External links
 Official website
 ARRS Race Series results

Half marathons in Germany
Recurring sporting events established in 1995
Inline speed skating competitions